The 2016 Oceania Rugby Women's Championship was the inaugural Oceania Championship for women's rugby in the region. It was held in Suva on November 5th. It was part of the 2017 Rugby World Cup qualifying process.

Teams 
Three teams initially nominated for the tournament were Fiji, Papua New Guinea and Samoa. With their long history of World Cup participation, Samoa seemed to be favourites to become the region's entry. However, in a surprise move, Oceania Rugby refused Samoa's participation on the same grounds as World Rugby had barred Kenya and Uganda from African regional qualification – the lack of a robust domestic women’s fifteens rugby tournament (almost all of Samoa’s squads in past years had come from players living and playing in New Zealand and Australia). As such, the championship was decided in a one-off match between the remaining two teams, with Fiji winning to advance to the Repechage tournament in Hong Kong.

Playoff match

References 

2016 in women's rugby union
2016 in Oceanian rugby union
2016 in Fijian sport
Oceania Rugby Women's Championship